Collier is an English surname, derived from the word "coal".

People with this name include:
Ada Langworthy Collier (1843–1919), pen name, "Anna L. Cunningham", American writer
Anne Collier (born 1970), American visual artist
Arthur Collier (1680–1732), English philosopher
Austin Collier (1914–1991), English professional footballer
Barron Collier (1873–1939), American advertising entrepreneur
Barry Collier (basketball), athletic director, Butler University
Barry Collier (politician), New South Wales politician
Basil Collier, military historian
Bernard Collier (1802–1890), English-born Mauritius Roman Catholic prelate
Bill Collier (1921–2015), Australian rugby league footballer
Bobby Collier (1929–2000), American football player
Calvin J. Collier (born 1942), FTC chair
Celester Collier, American basketball coach
Charles Collier (disambiguation), multiple people
Christopher Collier (cricketer) (1888–1916), English cricketer
Christopher Collier (historian) (b. 1930), American historian and author
Constance Collier (1878–1955), British-born American film actress
David Collier (sports administrator) (b. 1956), CEO, England and Wales Cricket Board
David Collier (cartoonist) (b. 1963), Canadian alternative cartoonist
David Collier (political scientist), qualitative methodology and Latin American politics
David Charles Collier "D. C." Collier, San Diego real estate developer
Don Collier (1928–2021), American actor
Edward Collier (pirate), 17th century
Elisha Collier, inventor of the flintlock revolver
Elliot Collier, (soccer) footballer for Chicago Fire and New Zealand
Evert Collier (c. 1640–1708), Dutch painter
Francis Augustus Collier (1783-1849), Royal Navy rear-admiral
Frank Collier, former British rugby league footballer
George Collier (1738–1795), Royal Navy vice-admiral
Sir George Collier, 1st Baronet (1774–1824), Royal Navy officer
Gerard Collier, 5th Baron Monkswell (1947–2020), British politician
Giles Collier, (1622–1678), English divine
Harry Collier (1907–1994), Australian rules footballer in the Victorian Football League
Henry Herbert Collier (1859–1925), British motorcycle pioneer
Henry W. Collier (1801–1855), Governor of Alabama (1849–1853)
Ian Collier (d. 2008), British actor
Jacob Collier (b. 1994), British arranger-musician-singer
James Collier (1872–1933), American politician from Mississippi
James Lincoln Collier (b. 1928), journalist and writer
James Stansfield Collier (1870–1935), English physician and neurologist
Jason Collier (1977–2005), NBA basketball player
Jeremy Collier (1650–1726), English theatre critic
John Collier (Pre-Raphaelite painter) (1850–1934), artist
John Collier (fiction writer) (1901–1980), British author and screenplay writer
John Collier (sociologist) (1884-1968), American sociologist, head of the Bureau of Indian Affairs
John Payne Collier (1789–1883), British Shakespearean critic
Jonathan Collier, American television writer
L. J. Collier (born 1995), American football player
Laurence Collier (1890–1976), British ambassador to Norway (1939–1950)
Lois Collier (1919–1999), American film actress
Lou Collier (b. 1970), American baseball player
Margaret Wootten Collier (1869-1947), American author
Marie Collier (1927–1971), Australian operatic soprano
Mark H. Collier, former president of Baldwin-Wallace College
Marsha Collier, American author and radio personality
Mary Collier (c.1688–1762), English poet
Meghan Collier (born 1996), American lawyer, hero to all those who have encountered the ICE
Michael Collier (disambiguation), several people
 Michael Collier (photographer), American photographer
 Michael Collier (poet) (born 1953), American poet, teacher and editor
 Michael Collier (swimmer) (born 1971), Sierra Leonean swimmer
 Mike Collier (born 1953), American football player
Mitty Collier (born 1941), American gospel and R&B singer
Napheesa Collier (born 1996), American basketball player
Norman Collier (1925–2013), British comedian
Patience Collier (1910–1987), British actress
Paul Collier, British author and Professor of Economics at Oxford
Paul Collier (activist) (1964–2010), Australian disability activist
Paul Collier (snooker referee) (born 1970), from Wales
Peter Collier (politician), Australian politician
Peter Collier (political author) (b. 1939), American writer
Peter Fenelon Collier (1849–1909), Irish publisher, father of Robert Joseph Collier
Philip Collier (1873–1978), former Premier of Western Australia
R. John Collier (b. 1938), American microbiologist and biochemist
Robert Collier (author) (1885–1950), American author of self-help, and New Thought metaphysical books
Robert Joseph Collier (1876–1918), American publisher, son of Peter Fenelon Collier
Robert Porrett Collier, 1st Baron Monkswell (1817–1886), English judge and politician
Ron Collier (1930–2003), Canadian jazz trombonist
Sophia Collier, founder of the American Natural Beverage Corp
Tim Collier (born 1954), NFL footballer
Thomas Collier (disambiguation), several people
Thomas Collier (painter) (1840–1891), English landscape painter.
Thomas Collier (Unitarian) (c. 1615–c. 1691), English preacher
Tom Collier (musician), percussionist and vibraphonist
Tom Collier (footballer) (born 1989), Australian rules football player
Vanessa Collier, American saxophonist, singer and songwriter
William Collier (disambiguation), various people, including
 William Collier Jr. (1902–1987), American actor
 William Collier Sr. (1864–1944), American writer, director and actor
 William Collier (colonist) (c. 1585–1671), English settler in Massachusetts
 William Collier (MP), MP for Truro, 1713–15, and manager of the Drury Lane Theatre
 William Collier (footballer) (born 1890), Scottish footballer, played for Scotland in 1922
 William Miller Collier (1867–1956), American diplomat

References

English-language surnames
Occupational surnames
English-language occupational surnames